Len Harris(1916–1995) was a British cinematographer and camera operator.

Selected filmography
 Once a Sinner (1950)
 My Wife's Lodger (1952)
 Further Up the Creek (1958)
 Gaolbreak (1962)

References

External links
 

1916 births
1995 deaths
British cinematographers
Artists from London